Uriah Heep are an English rock band from London. Formed in late 1969, the group originally featured vocalist David Byron, guitarist and backing vocalist Mick Box, keyboardist, guitarist and vocalist Ken Hensley, bassist Paul Newton, and drummer Alex Napier. Nigel Olsson replaced Napier in early 1970, with both drummers contributing to the band's debut album ...Very 'Eavy ...Very 'Umble. Olsson was replaced by Keith Baker and then Iain Clark, before Lee Kerslake joined as the group's first long-term drummer in late 1971, when Mark Clarke also replaced Newton. Clarke was later replaced by Gary Thain, who first appeared on 1972's Demons and Wizards. Thain was fired from the band in early 1975 due to an "increasing drug problem", which eventually led to his death from a heroin overdose on 8 December that year; he was replaced by John Wetton.

Byron was fired from Uriah Heep in 1976 due to his growing alcohol abuse, which led to his death from liver failure in 1985. He was replaced by John Lawton, as bassist Trevor Bolder also joined during the same period, following Wetton's departure. After tensions arose between Lawton and Hensley, the vocalist left and was replaced by John Sloman, while Kerslake was replaced by Chris Slade shortly after his arrival. Due to disagreements with the addition of Sloman and the band's musical direction, Hensley left the band in 1980 and was briefly replaced by Gregg Dechert. By April 1981, only Box remained in Uriah Heep, rebuilding the band with the addition of bassist Bob Daisley, returning drummer Kerslake (both recently departed from Ozzy Osbourne's band), keyboardist John Sinclair (later of Ozzy Osbourne's band with Daisley,) and new vocalist Peter Goalby (recently of Trapeze).

After the release of Abominog and Head First, Bolder returned to Uriah Heep in 1983. Goalby and Sinclair left in 1986, with Andy Scott's Sweet keyboardist Phil Lanzon and, breifly, Steff Fontaine taking over on vocals before Bernie Shaw was brought in a few months later. Uriah Heep's lineup remained stable until January 2007, when Kerslake was forced to leave the band due to "ongoing health problems". He was replaced by Russell Gilbrook in March. On 21 May 2013, Bolder died of cancer. He was later replaced by Dave Rimmer.

Current members

Former members

Substitute musicians

Session musicians

Timeline

Lineups
Dates are taken from the band's official website. Member changes are highlighted in bold.

References

External links
Uriah Heep official website

Uriah Heep